Gary Paul Butcher (born 11 March 1975) is a former English first-class cricketer. The brother of England Test player Mark and son of Alan, is an all rounder who bowled right arm with a hint of swing.

Butcher started his career with Glamorgan in 1994, taking a wicket with his very first delivery in the Sunday League. He made his only first-class hundred in 1997, against Oxford University from just 64 balls. His best bowling figures came against Gloucestershire at Bristol in 1996 when he took 7/77.

After not being able to command a regular position in the side he crossed over to Surrey in 1999. At Surrey he was part of a successful team, winning the County Championship.

He is known mainly by his middle name, "Paul" which he picked up at Oxford University. Butcher has now taken up a full-time job at King's College School in Wimbledon, as a sports teacher. He teaches rugby, football, cricket, basketball and hockey.

References

External links
 

1975 births
English cricketers
Glamorgan cricketers
Living people
Surrey cricketers
Hertfordshire cricketers
Black British sportsmen
English people of Jamaican descent